Mark as a surname may refer to:

Donald Mark (1926-2018), American judge
Hans Mark (1929–2021), German-born American aerospace engineer
Heinrich Mark (1911–2004), Estonian politician
Jacob Mark (born 1991), Danish politician
Melissa Mark-Viverito, American politician
Michael Mark (disambiguation), multiple people
Minka Mark, fictional character in Littlest Pet Shop
Nellie V. Mark (1857–1935), American physician, suffragist
Oliver Mark, German photographer
Robert Mark, Commissioner of the Metropolitan Police
Ülar Mark (born 1968), Estonian architect

See also
Mark (given name)
Marc (surname)
Marks (surname)
Marx (surname)

Surnames
Estonian-language surnames
English-language surnames
Danish-language surnames
Surnames of Scandinavian origin
Surnames from given names